This is a list of the States of India ranked in order of average number of persons in a family. This information was compiled from NFHS-3. National Family health survey (NFHS) is a large-scale, multi round survey conducted by the International Institute of Population Sciences (IIPS), Mumbai designated by the Ministry of Health and Family Welfare (MOHFW), Government of India. NFHS-3 was released on 11 Oct 2007 and the detailed survey can be viewed in the following website  The average household size of India is 4.8. The lowest is 3.5 in Tamil Nadu and the highest is 5.7 in Uttar Pradesh. India has more than 27 crore households.

List

Indian households with number of members:

References

Housing in India
Lists of subdivisions of India
India, household size